Castle Rock Hoodoos Provincial Park is a provincial park in British Columbia, Canada.  Located on the Deadman Plateau northwest of Kamloops, the park was originally named Deadman Hoodoos Provincial Park and was created on July 23, 1997 and was 34 hectares in size.  The park was reduced in size to 16 hectares on April 11, 2001, and renamed at the same time.

References
BCGNIS entry
BC Parks website entry

Provincial parks of British Columbia
Thompson Country
1997 establishments in British Columbia
Protected areas established in 1997